This article shows the roster of all participating teams at the 2017 FIVB Volleyball World Grand Prix.

Group 1

The following is the Belgian roster in the 2017 World Grand Prix.

Head coach: Gert Vande Broek

The following is the Brazilian roster in the 2017 World Grand Prix.

Head coach: José Roberto Guimarães

The following is the Chinese roster in the 2017 World Grand Prix.

Head coach: An Jiajie

The following is the Brazilian roster in the 2017 World Grand Prix.

Head coach:  Marcos Kwiek

The following is the Italian roster in the 2017 World Grand Prix.

Head coach: Davide Mazzanti

The following is the Japanese roster in the 2017 World Grand Prix.

Head coach: Kumi Nakada

The following is the Dutch roster in the 2017 World Grand Prix.

Head coach:  Jamie Morrison

The following is the Russian roster in the 2017 World Grand Prix.

Head coach: Vladimir Kuziutkin

The following is the Serbian roster in the 2017 World Grand Prix.

Head coach: Zoran Terzić

The following is the Thai roster in the 2017 World Grand Prix.

Head coach: Danai Sriwatcharamethakul

The following is the Turkish roster in the 2017 World Grand Prix.

Head coach:  Giovanni Guidetti

The following is the American roster in the 2017 World Grand Prix.

Head coach: Karch Kiraly

Group 2

The following is the Argentine roster in the 2017 World Grand Prix.

Head coach: Guillermo Orduna

The following is the Bulgarian roster in the 2017 World Grand Prix.

Head coach: Ivan Dimitrov

The following is the Canadian roster in the 2017 World Grand Prix.

Head coach:  Marcello Abbondanza

The following is the Colombian roster in the 2017 World Grand Prix.

Head coach:  Antônio Rizola Neto

The following is the Croatian roster in the 2017 World Grand Prix.

Head coach: Miroslav Aksentijević

The following is the Czech roster in the 2017 World Grand Prix.

Head coach: Zdeněk Pommer

The following is the German roster in the 2017 FIVB Volleyball World Grand Prix.

Head coach: Koslowski Felix

The following is the Kazakhstani roster in the 2017 World Grand Prix.

Head coach: Shapran Vyacheslav

The following is the Peruvian roster in the 2017 World Grand Prix.

Head coach:  Luizomar de Moura

The following is the Polish roster in the 2017 World Grand Prix.

Head coach: Jacek Nawrocki

The following is the Puerto Rican roster in the 2017 World Grand Prix.

Head coach:  Javier Gaspar

The following is the Korean roster in the 2017 World Grand Prix.

Head coach: Hong Sung-jin

Group 3

The following is the Algerian roster in the 2017 World Grand Prix.

Head coach:

The following is the Australian roster in the 2017 World Grand Prix.

Head coach:

The following is the Cameroonian roster in the 2017 World Grand Prix.

Head coach:

The following is the French roster in the 2017 World Grand Prix.

Head coach:

The following is the Hungarian roster in the 2017 World Grand Prix.

Head coach:

The following is the Mexican roster in the 2017 World Grand Prix.

Head coach:

The following is the Trinidadian roster in the 2017 World Grand Prix.

Head coach:

The following is the Venezuelan roster in the 2017 World Grand Prix.

Head coach:  Ihosvanny Chambers

References

External links
Official website

2017
2017 in women's volleyball